Eva Bull Holte (15 January 1922 – 15 February 1993) was a Norwegian painter and printmaker.

Personal life
Holte was born in Kristiania on 15 January 1922 to Hildur Jenny Marie Knudsen and Carl Albert Bull. She was married to industrialist Johan Berthin Holte.

Career
Holte studied at the Norwegian National Academy of Craft and Art Industry from 1940 to 1944. and further at the Norwegian National Academy of Fine Arts under Jean Heiberg from 1947 to 1950. She studied at the École des Beaux-Arts from 1951 to 1953.

She had her debut exhibition in 1957 at Galleri Per in Oslo, with motives from mountain landscapes in France and Telemark, and later also painted landscapes from Jutland and Mallorca, as well as portraits. She is represented in the Norwegian National Museum of Art, Architecture and Design with four paintings, Lier I (1963), Tange (Danmark) (1968), Swaldale in Yorkshire (1974) and Mot aften, Harang. 

Holte died in Oslo on 15 February 1993. She is buried in Åmotsdal. Eva Bull Holtes Museum is located in Åmotsdal in Seljord.

References

Further reading

1922 births
1993 deaths
People from Oslo
Norwegian painters
Oslo National Academy of the Arts alumni
20th-century Norwegian women artists
Norwegian women painters